Nikollë Bardhi (1551–1617) was an Albanian prelate of the Roman Catholic Church. He played a key role in the Albanian struggle against the Ottoman Empire.

Nikollë Bardhi was born in region of Zadrima, Lezhë, modern northern Albania in 1551. His family included several notable figures of Albanian history like Frang Bardhi, writer of the early eras of Albanian literature and the Archbishop of Antivari, Gjergj Bardhi who was Nikollë Bardhi's nephew. After becoming a vicar in Rodon he was appointed vicar of the diocese of
Mat, when Nikollë Mekajshi was the bishop of the diocese. In 1597 he became apostolic vicar and later bishop of the Roman Catholic Diocese of Sapë.

See also 
Frang Bardhi
Gjergj Bardhi
Tosol Bardhi

Sources 

Nikolle
1551 births
1617 deaths
16th-century Albanian Roman Catholic bishops
People from Lezhë
17th-century Albanian Roman Catholic bishops